Snow White is a popular fairy tale.

Snow White or Snow White and the Seven Dwarfs may also refer to:

Films 
 Snow White (1902 film), a silent film
 Snow White (1916 film), a Players-Lasky Corporation silent film
 Snow White (1933 film), a Betty Boop cartoon from Fleischer Studios
 Snow White and the Seven Dwarfs (1937 film), a feature animated film produced by Walt Disney
 Snow White (Disney character)
 Snow White (franchise)
 Snow White and the Seven Dwarfs (1955 film), a German film by Erich Kobler
 Snow White and the Three Stooges, a 1961 film starring Patricia Medina and Carol Heiss
 Snow White (1962 film), an East German film
 Snow White (1987 film), a musical starring Diana Rigg, Billy Barty, Nicola Stapleton and Sarah Patterson
 Snow White: Happily Ever After (1989 film), an unofficial sequel animated film based of the original fairy tale
 Snow White: A Tale of Terror, a 1997 TV horror film starring Sigourney Weaver, Taryn Davis, Monica Keena and Sam Neill
 Snow White: The Fairest of Them All, a 2001 TV fantasy-adventure film starring Kristin Kreuk and Miranda Richardson
 Snow White: The Sequel (Blanche-Neige, la suite), a 2007 animated feature-length film
 Snow White and the Huntsman, a 2012 fantasy-action film starring Kristen Stewart and Charlize Theron
 Snow White: A Deadly Summer, a 2012 horror film
 Grimm's Snow White, a 2012 fantasy film
 Snow White (Once Upon a Time) (also known as Mary Margaret Blanchard), a character from the ABC television series Once Upon a Time
 Snow White (Shrek), a character in the Shrek film series
 Snow White, a fictional device in the 2006 film Déjà Vu

Literature
 Snow White and the Seven Dwarfs (book), a 1938 book by Wanda Gág
 Snow White (1967 novel), a novel by Donald Barthelme
 Snow White (Fables), a fictional character in the comic book Fables
 Snow-White and Rose-Red, a German fairy tale
 "Snow-White-Fire-Red", an Italian fairy tale
 Varda or Snow-white, a fictional deity in J. R. R. Tolkien's legendarium

Music
 Snow White (album), a 2005 album by Magic Dirt
 Snow White and the Seven Dwarfs (soundtrack), a soundtrack album from the 1937 film
 "Snow White", a song by Christina Grimmie from Side A
 "Snow White", a song by Streetheart
 Snowhite, original band name of the American metal band Znowhite

Stage productions
 Snow White and the Seven Dwarfs (libretto by Adelheid Wette)
 Snow White and the Seven Dwarfs (1912 play), a Broadway play
 Snow White and the Seven Dwarfs (musical), a 1979 musical based on the 1937 film
 Snow White and the Seven Dwarfs (ballet), a ballet performed by the Placer Theatre Ballet

Television
 "Snow White and the Seven Dwarfs", an episode of Faerie Tale Theatre
 "Rugrats Tales from the Crib: Snow White", an episode of Rugrats

Other uses
 Snow White (horse), a champion standardbred racing horse
 Snow White design language, an industrial design language used by Apple Computer
 Operation Snow White, a 1970s government-infiltration and information-suppression effort by the Church of Scientology
 225088 Gonggong or Snow White, a trans-Neptunian object 
 Hallard White or Snow White, a former All Black and Presidents of Auckland and New Zealand Unions
 Snow White and the 7 Dwarfs (video game), a 2006 game for the PlayStation 2
 Snow White Sugar, a brand of sugar produced by Hacienda Mercedita in Puerto Rico

See also
 Blancanieves, a 2012 Spanish film by Pablo Berger
 Happily Ever After (1993 film), an American animated film
 The Legend of Snow White (Shirayuki Hime no Densetsu), a Japanese anime television series
 Mirror Mirror (film), a 2012 comedy film starring Lily Collins and Julia Roberts 
 Schneewittchen (opera), a 1998 opera by Heinz Holliger
 7 Dwarves – Men Alone in the Wood, a 2004 German comedy
 Snow White and the Huntsman, a 2012 action film starring Kristen Stewart, Sam Claflin, Charlize Theron and Chris Hemsworth
 "Snow White 2", a 1981 episode of The Goodies
 Snow White with the Red Hair (Akagami no Shirayukihime), a Japanese anime television series
 Snowy White, English musician
 White as Snow (disambiguation)